Kmetoband is a Slovak band. With the hit Amen Savore ranking high in Eastern European charts, the profile of modern Romany music saw a boost, and the industry saw a heightened interest in other Slovak musical groups because of it.

References

External links
 official website
 Youtube videos

Slovak musical groups